In music, Op. 132 stands for Opus number 132. Compositions that are assigned this number include:

 Beethoven – String Quartet No. 15
 Hovhaness – Symphony No. 2
 Prokofiev – Cello Concertino
 Reger – Variations and Fugue on a Theme by Mozart
 Schumann – Märchenerzählungen